|}

The Prix Maurice de Nieuil is a Group 2 flat horse race in France open to thoroughbreds aged four years or older. It is run at Longchamp over a distance of 2,800 metres (about 1¾ miles), and it is scheduled to take place each year in July.

History
The event was established in 1920, and it was initially called the Prix des Maréchaux. It was named in honour of the French and Allied marshals (maréchaux) who served in World War I. The race was originally staged at Saint-Cloud, and it was open to horses aged three or older. The early runnings were contested over 3,100 metres, and the distance was cut to 2,800 metres in 1928. It was shortened to 2,600 metres in 1936.

The Prix des Maréchaux was cancelled in 1940, and for a period thereafter it was held at Longchamp (1941 – 42, 1944 – 45), Le Tremblay (1943) and Maisons-Laffitte (1946). The Longchamp editions were run over 2,500 metres, and this became the regular distance when it returned to Saint-Cloud. It was known as the Prix de Strasbourg in 1947 and 1948.

The race was renamed the Prix Maurice de Nieuil in 1949. This was in memory of Maurice de Nieuil (1860 –1949), a former chairman of the Société Sportive d'Encouragement, one of the precursors of France Galop.

The Prix Maurice de Nieuil was transferred to Maisons-Laffitte in 1990. It was closed to three-year-olds and extended to 2,800 metres in 2001. It was run over 3,000 metres in 2004, but it reverted to 2,800 metres the following year.

The event moved to Longchamp in 2006, and it is now part of the Grand Prix de Paris meeting. It is currently held on the evening of July 14, the French national holiday of Bastille Day.

Records
Most successful horse (2 wins):
 Or du Rhin – 1960, 1961

Leading jockey (7 wins):
 Christophe Soumillon – Martaline (2003), Bussoni (2007), Tac de Boistron (2013), Terrubi (2014), Candarliya (2016), Marmelo (2018), Valia (2021)

Leading trainer (9 wins):
 André Fabre – Saint Estephe (1985), French Glory (1990), Toulon (1991), Serrant (1993), Public Purse (1998), War Game (2000), Martaline (2003), Bellamy Cay (2006), Talismanic (2017)

Leading owner (5 wins):
 Marcel Boussac – Denver (1934), Jock (1941), Macip (1955), Argal (1958), Emerald (1965)
 Khalid Abdullah – French Glory (1990), Toulon (1991), Public Purse (1998), Martaline (2003), Bellamy Cay (2006)

Winners since 1980

 The 2016 and 2017 races took place at Saint-Cloud while Longchamp was closed for redevelopment.

Earlier winners

 1920: Dolphin
 1921: Nouvel An
 1922: Happy Go Lucky
 1923: Bou Jeloud
 1924: Le Capucin
 1925: Transvaal
 1926: Warminster
 1927: Cerulea
 1928: Bois Josselyn
 1929: Pinceau
 1930: Beldurhissa
 1931: Kill Lady
 1932: Filarete
 1933: Casterari
 1934: Denver
 1935: Chaudiere
 1936: Cap Nord
 1937: Mont a la Quesne
 1938: Nica
 1939: Premier Baiser
 1940: no race
 1941: Jock
 1942: Porphyros
 1943:
 1944: Brazza
 1945: Samaritain
 1946:
 1947: Cappielluca
 1948: Sunny Boy
 1949:
 1950: Templier
 1951: Oghio
 1952: Magnific
 1953: Coquelin
 1954: Soleil Levant
 1955: Macip
 1956: Master Boing
 1957: Romantisme
 1958: Argal
 1959: Wildfire
 1960: Or du Rhin
 1961: Or du Rhin
 1962: Esquimau
 1963: Tournevent
 1964: Firstborn
 1965: Emerald
 1966: Kimberley
 1967: Sailor
 1968: Beau Paon
 1969: Copsale
 1970: Ramsin
 1971: Crucible
 1972: Homeric
 1973: Valuta
 1974: Admetus
 1975: Battle Song
 1976: Condorcet
 1977: Riboboy
 1978: Midshipman
 1979: Singapore Girl

See also
 List of French flat horse races
 Recurring sporting events established in 1920  – this race is included under its original title, Prix des Maréchaux.

References

 France Galop / Racing Post:
 galop.courses-france.com:
 1920–1949, 1950–1979, 1980–present

 france-galop.com – A Brief History: Prix Maurice de Nieuil.
 galopp-sieger.de – Prix Maurice de Nieuil.
 horseracingintfed.com – International Federation of Horseracing Authorities – Prix Maurice de Nieuil (2017).
 pedigreequery.com – Prix Maurice de Nieuil.

Open long distance horse races
Longchamp Racecourse
Horse races in France